Otorohanga railway station served the town of Ōtorohanga, on the North Island Main Trunk in New Zealand from 1887 to 2021. The current station dates from 1924.

Trains calling at Ōtorohanga included The Overlander, Blue Streak, Scenic Daylight, Daylight Limited, Northerner, Northern Explorer, and Night Limited. By 2012, passenger numbers had dropped to an average of two per train, which brought about a brief closure from 24 June. Initially the reinstatement was for summer only from 10 December. No scheduled passenger services have served the station since December 2021.

History 
Surveying to extend the railway  from Te Awamutu to Ōtorohanga was started in 1883 by Charles Wilson Hursthouse. The first sod ceremony was performed at the Puniu River on 15 April 1885. Trains were working through to Ōtorohanga by January 1887, and the extension opened on 6, or 8 March 1887, though the line wasn't handed over from the Public Works Department to the Railways Department (NZR) until Wednesday 9 March. Initially trains only ran on Tuesdays and Thursdays.

Coates & Metcalfe were the contractors for the  extension of the NIMT, from Ōtorohanga to Te Kuiti. Until August 1887, the contractors provided goods trains on the extension. By October 1887 goods trains ran on Mondays and Fridays. NZR took over from the contractors, adding a passenger service on those days from Friday 2 December 1887.

By April 1887 there was a 4th class station building and by 1896 a platform, cart approach,  x  goods shed, loading bank, cattle yards, urinals and a passing loop for 31 wagons. There was a  Post Office at the station from 1893 to 1908. In 1910 a station on the town side of the line replaced the old station and the goods shed was moved near the old station site. A stationmaster's house was added in 1912 and a crane in 1913. On 17 December 1923 the station burnt down. The current station opened in 1924. Electric light was added in 1927. Three railway houses were added in 1953. In 1980 there was a station building, platform, goods shed, gantry, stockyards and a loop for 81 wagons. The station was given a New Zealand Historic Places Trust Category 2 listing in 1985.

Services
Scheduled passenger services were terminated in December 2021.

Patronage 
As shown in the table and graph below, passenger numbers peaked during World War 2 -

Rangitoto Colliery Co. branch

In 1890 Ellis & Burnand had sought tenders for a tramway to bring timber to their mill and it was mentioned as flooded in 1892. The 1919 Railways Authorisation Bill included a, "branch line from Otorohanga, along right bank of the Waipa River, to the south boundary of Block VI, Mangaoronga survey district. Length about 7½ miles." The Railway Atlas indicates the line was horse worked, served the Ellis and Burnand Mill (open 1889–1912), as well as the colliery, and existed by 1921. The 1921 photograph (left) appears to show a horse worked tramway, but only remnants of the line appear in the 1947 photos.

The mine closed in 1937, after 11 years of working, "as the coal was of inferior quality and the expenses of mining and marketing the output were unduly high." However, a 1944 Parliamentary report indicates that production recommenced, but a road was built, rather than using the tramway. The report said, "Rangitoto Opencast.—Stripping of this area, adjacent to the old Rangitoto Colliery, some eight miles from Otorohanga, commenced, in July. An access road was also constructed. Coal-production started in September, Output for 1944 was 1,797 tons."

References

External links 
New Zealand Herald, Volume XXIV, Issue 7844, 13 January 1887, Page 5 progress report on NIMT construction and the effect on Ōtorohanga
Waikato Times, Volume XXIII, Issue 2271, 29 January 1887, Page 3 construction of goods shed and station by Mr Worthington expected to be complete a few weeks after the line opened
Auckland Weekly News photo 11 June 1898 p4 (AWNS-18980611-4-4)
Taranaki Daily News, Volume LV, Issue 306, 19 May 1913, Page 4 shunter's death

Railway stations in New Zealand
Ōtorohanga District
Railway stations opened in 1887
Railway stations closed in 2012
Rail transport in Waikato
Buildings and structures in Waikato
Heritage New Zealand Category 2 historic places in Waikato